Annoville is a former commune in the Manche department in the Normandy region in northwestern France. On 1 January 2023, Annoville merged with Lingreville to form Tourneville-sur-Mer.

Population

See also
Communes of the Manche department

References

Former communes of Manche